Azizabad (also Romanized as ‘Azīzābād) is a village in Hezarmasjed Rural District, in the Central District of Kalat County, Razavi Khorasan Province, Iran. At the 2006 census, its population was 45, in 9 families.

See also 

 List of cities, towns and villages in Razavi Khorasan Province

References 

Populated places in Kalat County